"Jack & Diane" is a song written and performed by American singer-songwriter John Mellencamp, then performing as "John Cougar." Described by critics as a "love ballad," this song was released as the second single from Mellencamp's 1982 album American Fool, and was chosen by the Recording Industry Association of America (RIAA) as one of the Songs of the Century. It spent four weeks at number one on the Billboard Hot 100 in 1982 and is Mellencamp's most successful hit single.

American singer-songwriter Jessica Simpson sampled this in her song "I Think I'm in Love with You," the third single from her debut album Sweet Kisses.

In 2018 country singer Jake Owen sampled this and as a tribute song titled I Was Jack (You Were Diane).

Background and production
According to Mellencamp, "Jack & Diane" was based on the 1962 Tennessee Williams film Sweet Bird of Youth. He said of recording the song: "'Jack & Diane' was a terrible record to make. When I play it on guitar by myself, it sounds great; but I could never get the band to play along with me. That's why the arrangement's so weird. Stopping and starting, it's not very musical." Mellencamp has also stated that the clapping was used only to help keep time and was supposed to be removed in the final mix. However, he chose to leave the clapping in once he realized that the song would not work without it.

In 2014 Mellencamp revealed that the song was originally about an interracial couple, where Jack was African American and not a football star, but he was persuaded by the record company to change it.

The song was recorded at Criteria Studios in Miami, Florida, and was produced by Mellencamp and Don Gehman (with Gehman also engineering). Backing Mellencamp were guitarists/backing vocalists Mick Ronson, Mike Wanchic, Larry Crane, drummer Kenny Aronoff, bassist/backing vocalist Robert Frank and keyboardist Eric Rosser.

In 1982, producer and guitarist Mick Ronson worked with Mellencamp on his American Fool album, and in particular on "Jack & Diane." In a 2008 interview with Classic Rock magazine, Mellencamp recalled: 
Mick was very instrumental in helping me arrange that song, as I'd thrown it on the junk heap. Ronson came down and played on three or four tracks and worked on the American Fool record for four or five weeks. All of a sudden, for 'Jack & Diane,' Mick said, 'Johnny, you should put baby rattles on there.' I thought, 'What the f*ck does put baby rattles on the record mean?' So he put the percussion on there and then he sang the part 'let it rock, let it roll' as a choir-ish-type thing, which had never occurred to me. And that is the part everybody remembers on the song. It was Ronson's idea.

Cash Box said that "this shuffling pop 'ditty'...has a certain power that hits to the heartland with a warm, descriptive storyline that’s both personal and universal." Billboard said that "The hooks here are in the storyline, which traces a blue collar romance 'in the heartland' where Cougar hails from, capped by taut guitar and percussion."

Charts

Weekly charts

Year end charts

All-time charts

Certifications

See also
List of Billboard Hot 100 number-one singles of 1982

References

External links
 Jim Beviglia (July 8, 2012), "John Mellencamp, “Jack And Diane”", American Songwriter.

1982 singles
John Mellencamp songs
Billboard Hot 100 number-one singles
Cashbox number-one singles
RPM Top Singles number-one singles
Songs about the United States
Music videos directed by Bruce Gowers
Rock ballads
Songs written by John Mellencamp
Song recordings produced by Don Gehman
Warner Music Group singles
Riva Records singles
1982 songs
1980s ballads
American hard rock songs